Meena Ganesh is an Indian actress who acts mostly in Malayalam movies.

Filmography

Malayalam

TV serials
 Geethanjali
 Devaragam
 Snehatheeram
 Velankani Mathavu
 Ramayanam
 Calcutta Hospital
 Ettu Sundarikalum Njanum
 Mangalyam
 AL THWALAQ
 Kalyanaveeran
 Karunyam
 Vayalkilikal
 Sthree
Minnukettu
 Aa Amma

TV shows
 Sreekandan Nair Show

References

https://m3db.com/films-acted/22902

External links

Year of birth missing (living people)
Living people
Indian film actresses
20th-century Indian actresses
21st-century Indian actresses
Actresses in Malayalam cinema
Actresses in Malayalam television